Alain Laurier (born 12 September 1944) is a former French footballer turned manager-

Biography
Laurier was born in Créteil (Val-de-Marne). He made his debut for Coeuilly, which became Stade de Reims. At the champenois club, he played alongside big names such as Raymond Kopa and Lucien Muller. He played his first match in the championship alongside professionals on 17 October 1965. He took part in the return of the club to the top-flight in 1970. Two years later, he was signed by Paris Football Club, who had returned to Division 1. However, the Parisian club were relegated again two years later. Alain Laurier then joined Angers, without further success. He spent two seasons with the club in Division 2. In 1976, he began his conversion to management. He became manager (DEPF), while continuing as a player at Le Mans. He continued as a player-manager at Caen, stopping as a player in his last season at the Normandy club. He then coached Poissy, Grenoble, Istres, Dijon as well as foreign clubs in Dubai and China. From 2002 to 2004, he was technical director of the  Qatar team.

Honours
 Amateur and military international
 Took part in 1968 Mexico Olympics
 Champion of France D2 in 1966 with Stade de Reims
 First match in Division 2 : 17 October 1965 :Reims-Boulogne (2-1)
 First match in Division 1 : 8 October 1966 :Reims-Bordeaux (4-1)
 63 matches and 3 goals in Division 1 with Stade de Reims
 69 matches and 7 goals in Division 2 with Stade de Reims
 Best manager in D2 in 1991 with Istres (awarded by France-Football magazine)

Publications
 Football "Culture tactique et principes de jeu", Chiron Sports, 1975
 "Perfectionnement pour l'élite" in Arabic for the Qatar Football Federation in 2003

References

External links



1944 births
Living people
Sportspeople from Créteil
French footballers
Association football midfielders
Angers SCO players
Stade Malherbe Caen players
Le Mans FC players
Paris FC players
Stade de Reims players
Ligue 1 players
Ligue 2 players
Olympic footballers of France
Footballers at the 1968 Summer Olympics
French football managers
Stade Malherbe Caen managers
Grenoble Foot 38 managers
Le Mans FC managers
FC Istres managers
Dijon FCO managers
Al-Wasl F.C. managers
Guangzhou City F.C. managers
Ligue 1 managers
Ligue 2 managers
UAE Pro League managers
Chinese Super League managers
French expatriate football managers
French expatriate sportspeople in the United Arab Emirates
French expatriate sportspeople in China
French expatriate sportspeople in Qatar
Expatriate football managers in the United Arab Emirates
Expatriate football managers in China
Footballers from Val-de-Marne